Oscar N. Onyema  (born 19 August 1968), is the Group Chief Executive Officer of Nigerian Exchange Group Plc (formerly known as the Nigerian Stock Exchange), an institution that services the largest economy in Africa and champions the development of Africa’s financial markets. Prior to attaining this position, he was the CEO of The Nigerian Stock Exchange (“NSE”) for 10 years. He has widely been recognized as an agent of change in restoring and growing investors’ confidence and advancing Nigeria’s capital markets towards a path of sustainable growth and development. 
Onyema is the Chairman of two affiliate companies: Central Securities Clearing System Plc (CSCS), the clearing, settlement, and depository for the Nigerian capital market; and NG Clearing Limited, which is the premier Central Counter Party Clearing House (CCP) in Nigeria. He serves on several other boards and committees domestically and internationally including the Pension Commission of Nigeria (PENCOM), London Stock Exchange Group (LSEG) Africa Advisory Group (LAAG), and Membership Committee of the WFE.
He served for over 20 years in United States financial markets and the Nigerian information technology sector.

Birth and education
Oscar Onyema was born in Nigeria to the family of His Royal Majesty Eze V. B. C. Onyema III, the Eze Onyema III of Ogwu-Ikpele.  He holds an MBA in Finance and Investments from Baruch College, New York City. He received his bachelor degree in Computer Engineering from Obafemi Awolowo University, Ile-Ife, Nigeria. He attended Harvard Business School's six-week Advanced Management Program. Onyema holds Financial Industry Regulatory Authority Series 7, 24, and 63 licenses, and is active in Security Traders Association of New York, and Securities Industry and Financial Markets Association.

Professional career
Onyema is the Group Chief Executive Officer of Nigerian Exchange Group Plc (formerly known as the Nigerian Stock Exchange), an institution that services the largest economy in Africa and champions the development of Africa’s financial markets. Prior to attaining this position, he was the CEO of The Nigerian Stock Exchange (“NSE”) for 10 years, where he launched a ‘Transformation Agenda’ that revamped the Exchange into a globally competitive securities exchange. He implemented several innovations centered on technology, product development and market infrastructure in Nigeria and across Africa, whilst driving stronger regulation and operational efficiencies market-wide, in an effort to develop a more robust and transparent global African capital market. 

Before joining the Nigerian capital market, he served for over 20 years in United States financial markets, managing market structure initiatives, products and securities exchange businesses and the Nigerian information technology sector.

Onyema has served as Senior Vice President and Chief Administrative Officer of the American Stock Exchange (Amex), which he joined in 2001. He was the first person of colour to hold that position.  He was instrumental in integrating Amex equity business into NYSE Euronext after its acquisition of Amex in 2008. He then managed NYSE Amex equity trading business, which he helped position as a premier market for small and mid-cap securities.

In 2009, Onyema founded Market Strategists LLC and consulted under the Gerson Lehrman Group platform in the United States. He successfully completed consultations enabling decision makers at investment firms and corporations better understand products, services, companies, and issues in global financial markets.

Onyema served as the Senior Vice President and Chief Administrative Officer at American Stock Exchange (Amex), which he joined in 2001.  He was the first person of colour to hold that position, and was instrumental in integrating the Amex equity business into the NYSE Euronext equity business after their acquisition of Amex in 2008.  He then managed the NYSE Amex equity trading business, which he helped position as a premier market for small and mid-cap securities.

He held various positions at New York Mercantile Exchange where he managed futures market structure initiatives, and Data Processing Maintenance and Services Ltd (an IBM business partner) where he sold IBM mid-range system solutions. He has also served as Adjunct Lecturer of Economics at Pace University, New York.

Onyema is the Chairman, West African Capital Market Integration Council; Chairman of Central Securities Clearing System (CSCS) Plc., the clearing house for the Nigerian capital market; Council member of the Chartered Institute of Stockbrokers of Nigeria (CIS); President of the African Securities Exchanges Association, and a Global Agenda Council member of the World Economic Forum. He also serves on the boards of all NSE subsidiaries, as well as FMDQ OTC PLC (FMDQ).

Onyema on the international front, occupies a seat on the London Stock Exchange Group Africa Advisory Group (LAAG). He also is part of the Thompson Reuters Africa Advisory Network and also has served as a Global Agenda Council member of World Economic Forum (WEF)

On the regional scene, Onyema plays an important role in the decision making of West African Capital Market integration council (WACMIC), (of which he is the immediate past chairman) and the African Securities Exchanges Association (ASEA), which he is the current president.

Oscar N. Onyema and Nigerian Exchange Group

The Securities and Exchange Commission (SEC) of Nigeria, on 18 January 2012, approved the appointment of Oscar N. Onyema as the new Chief Executive Officer of the Nigerian Stock Exchange (NSE).

Awards and honours

Onyema was named man of the year for 2012,by ThisDay newspaper.

In 2014, Onyema was made an Officer of the Order of the Niger (OON) in "recognition of his contribution to economic development, the transformation of The Nigerian Stock Exchange and the Nigerian capital markets".
The Abuja Chamber of Commerce and Industry in January 2015 awarded, Oscar N. Onyema OON, most Innovative CEO of the year 2014, in recognition of his tremendous role in the development of the Nigerian capital market.

Oscar N. Onyema holds the traditional title of Öchiligwe of Ogwu-Ikpele and founded the Oscar N. Onyema foundation. A foundation he fully funds as a means to give back to indigent community members through education.

References

1968 births
Living people
Baruch College alumni
Obafemi Awolowo University alumni
Nigerian stockbrokers